Tocharian clothing refers to clothing worn by the Tocharians. A series of murals from Kizil, Kizilgaha and Kumtura caves depicting Kuchean royalties, knights, swordsmen and donors have provided the best source of information on Tocharian costume. Their clothes were made of colourful, richly patterned fabric; a single- or double-lapel, belted caftan was very popular. This type of clothing was referred to as East Sassanid costume by Albert von Le Coq. However, Mariachiara Gasparini argued that the style was under various influences, which can not be easily categorised as being strictly "Sasanian".

According to Mariachiara Gasparini:

Plaid textiles recovered from the Taklamakan Desert are of similar appearance to and are made with similar weaving techniques as textiles discovered at the Celtic sites of Hallstatt and Hallein.

Gallery

See also 

 Armenian dress
 Azerbaijani clothing
 Byzantine dress
 Central Asian clothing
 Parthian dress
 Saka clothing
 Scythian clothing
 Sogdian clothing
 Uyghur clothing
 Sampul tapestry
 Tocharian mummies
 Hephthalites

References 

clothing
History of Asian clothing
Clothing by ethnicity
Central Asian culture
Indo-European culture